The men's 5000 metres event at the 2005 European Athletics U23 Championships was held in Erfurt, Germany, at Steigerwaldstadion on 17 July.

Medalists

Results

Final
17 July

Participation
According to an unofficial count, 21 athletes from 10 countries participated in the event.

 (2)
 (3)
 (2)
 (2)
 (3)
 (1)
 (2)
 (1)
 (2)
 (3)

References

5000 metres
5000 metres at the European Athletics U23 Championships